The 2002 Huntingdonshire District Council election took place on 4 May 2002 to elect members of Huntingdonshire District Council in Cambridgeshire, England. One third of the council was up for election and the Conservative Party stayed in overall control of the council.

After the election, the composition of the council was:
Conservative 37
Liberal Democrats 13
Independent 3

Election result

Ward results

By-elections between 2002 and 2003

References

2002 English local elections
2002
2000s in Cambridgeshire